Wilfried Siegele (born 26 June 1958) is an Austrian racewalker. He competed in the men's 20 kilometres walk at the 1980 Summer Olympics.

References

1958 births
Living people
Athletes (track and field) at the 1980 Summer Olympics
Austrian male racewalkers
Olympic athletes of Austria
Place of birth missing (living people)